The Kids from O.W.L. is a children's television series made in New Zealand and aired in 1983 and 1984. O.W.L. (The Organisation for World Liberty) was a secret government organisation whose agents were young people with physical disabilities. Using devices like laser-beam-firing crutches and computerized wheelchairs, the kids from O.W.L. always overcame the bumbling plots of operatives from S.L.I.M.E. (the Southern Latitude's International Movement for Evil).

The Kids from O.W.L. pioneered the use of electronic graphics from Apple 2 and Apple 3 computers in New Zealand. It was produced by Kim Gabara.

External links  

1980s New Zealand television series
1983 New Zealand television series debuts
1984 New Zealand television series endings
New Zealand children's television series
New Zealand science fiction television series
Television shows set in New Zealand